Tom Cato Karlsen (born 1974) is a Norwegian politician and anesthesiologist.  He was elected as a deputy representative for the Parliament of Norway for Nordland county from 2013 to 2017.  He also was a state secretary for the Ministry of Transport and Communications from 2014 to 2017. On 26 October 2018, he was appointed to be the new County Governor of Nordland county.

References

1974 births
Living people
Nordland politicians
Politicians from Bodø
Progress Party (Norway) politicians
Deputy members of the Storting
Norwegian state secretaries
County governors of Norway
County governors of Nordland